The 1998 Arena Football League season was the 12th season of the Arena Football League. It was succeeded by 1999. The league champions were the Orlando Predators, who defeated the Tampa Bay Storm in ArenaBowl XII.

Standings

 Green indicates clinched playoff berth
 Purple indicates division champion
 Grey indicates best regular season record

Playoffs

All-Arena team

References